Abralia siedleckyi is a species of enoploteuthid cephalopod known from its type locality in the waters off South Africa. It resembles A. heminuchalis, and may be synonymous with it.

References

Abralia
Molluscs described in 1983